Rejaabad (also Romanized as Rejāābād; also known as Rijāābād) is a village in Mohammadabad Rural District, in the Central District of Marvdasht County, Fars Province, Iran. At the 2006 census, its population was 1,502, in 359 families.

References 

Populated places in Marvdasht County